The conservation movement, also known as nature conservation, is a political, environmental, and social movement that seeks to manage and protect natural resources, including animal, fungus, and plant species as well as their habitat for the future.  Conservationists are concerned with leaving the environment in a better state than the condition they found it in. Evidence-based conservation seeks to use high quality scientific evidence to make conservation efforts more effective.

The early conservation movement evolved out of necessity to maintain natural resources such as fisheries, wildlife management, water, soil, as well as conservation and sustainable forestry. The contemporary conservation movement has broadened from the early movement's emphasis on use of sustainable yield of natural resources and preservation of wilderness areas to include preservation of biodiversity. Some say the conservation movement is part of the broader and more far-reaching environmental movement, while others argue that they differ both in ideology and practice. Conservation is seen as differing from environmentalism and it is generally a conservative school of thought which aims to preserve natural resources expressly for their continued sustainable use by humans.

History

Early history

The conservation movement can be traced back to John Evelyn's work Sylva, presented as a paper to the Royal Society in 1662. Published as a book two years later, it was one of the most highly influential texts on forestry ever published. Timbre resources in England were becoming dangerously depleted at the time, and Evelyn advocated the importance of conserving the forests by managing the rate of depletion and ensuring that the cut down trees get replenished.

The field developed during the 18th century, especially in Prussia and France where scientific forestry methods were developed. These methods were first applied rigorously in British India from the early 19th century. The government was interested in the use of forest produce and began managing the forests with measures to reduce the risk of wildfire in order to protect the "household" of nature, as it was then termed. This early ecological idea was in order to preserve the growth of delicate teak trees, which was an important resource for the Royal Navy.

Concerns over teak depletion were raised as early as 1799 and 1805 when the Navy was undergoing a massive expansion during the Napoleonic Wars; this pressure led to the first formal conservation Act, which prohibited the felling of small teak trees. The first forestry officer was appointed in 1806 to regulate and preserve the trees necessary for shipbuilding.

This promising start received a setback in the 1820s and 30s, when laissez-faire economics and complaints from private landowners brought these early conservation attempts to an end.

In 1837, American poet George Pope Morris published "Woodman, Spare that Tree!", a Romantic poem urging a lumberjack to avoid an oak tree that has sentimental value. The poem was set to music later that year by Henry Russell. Lines from the song have been quoted by environmentalists.

Origins of the modern conservation movement
Conservation was revived in the mid-19th century, with the first practical application of scientific conservation principles to the forests of India. The conservation ethic that began to evolve included three core principles: that human activity damaged the environment, that there was a civic duty to maintain the environment for future generations, and that scientific, empirically based methods should be applied to ensure this duty was carried out. Sir James Ranald Martin was prominent in promoting this ideology, publishing many medico-topographical reports that demonstrated the scale of damage wrought through large-scale deforestation and desiccation, and lobbying extensively for the institutionalization of forest conservation activities in British India through the establishment of Forest Departments. Edward Percy Stebbing warned of desertification of India. The Madras Board of Revenue started local conservation efforts in 1842, headed by Alexander Gibson, a professional botanist who systematically adopted a forest conservation program based on scientific principles. This was the first case of state management of forests in the world.

These local attempts gradually received more attention by the British government as the unregulated felling of trees continued unabated. In 1850, the British Association in Edinburgh formed a committee to study forest destruction at the behest of Dr. Hugh Cleghorn a pioneer in the nascent conservation movement.

He had become interested in forest conservation in Mysore in 1847 and gave several lectures at the Association on the failure of agriculture in India. These lectures influenced the government under Governor-General Lord Dalhousie to introduce the first permanent and large-scale forest conservation program in the world in 1855, a model that soon spread to other colonies, as well the United States. In the same year, Cleghorn organised the Madras Forest Department and in 1860 the department banned the use shifting cultivation. Cleghorn's 1861 manual, The forests and gardens of South India, became the definitive work on the subject and was widely used by forest assistants in the subcontinent. In 1861, the Forest Department extended its remit into the Punjab.

Sir Dietrich Brandis, a German forester, joined the British service in 1856 as superintendent of the teak forests of Pegu division in eastern Burma. During that time Burma's teak forests were controlled by militant Karen tribals. He introduced the "taungya" system, in which Karen villagers provided labor for clearing, planting and weeding teak plantations. After seven years in Burma, Brandis was appointed Inspector General of Forests in India, a position he served in for 20 years. He formulated new forest legislation and helped establish research and training institutions. The Imperial Forest School at Dehradun was founded by him.

Germans were prominent in the forestry administration of British India. As well as Brandis, Berthold Ribbentrop and Sir William P.D. Schlich brought new methods to Indian conservation, the latter becoming the Inspector-General in 1883 after Brandis stepped down. Schlich helped to establish the journal Indian Forester in 1874, and became the founding director of the first forestry school in England at Cooper's Hill in 1885. He authored the five-volume Manual of Forestry (1889–96) on silviculture, forest management, forest protection, and forest utilization, which became the standard and enduring textbook for forestry students.

Conservation in the United States

The American movement received its inspiration from 19th century works that exalted the inherent value of nature, quite apart from human usage. Author Henry David Thoreau (1817–1862) made key philosophical contributions that exalted nature. Thoreau was interested in peoples' relationship with nature and studied this by living close to nature in a simple life. He published his experiences in the book Walden, which argued that people should become intimately close with nature. The ideas of Sir Brandis, Sir William P.D. Schlich and Carl A. Schenck were also very influential—Gifford Pinchot, the first chief of the USDA Forest Service, relied heavily upon Brandis' advice for introducing professional forest management in the U.S. and on how to structure the Forest Service.

Both conservationists and preservationists appeared in political debates during the Progressive Era (the 1890s–early 1920s). There were three main positions.

 Laissez-faire: The laissez-faire position held that owners of private property—including lumber and mining companies, should be allowed to do anything they wished on their properties.
 Conservationists: The conservationists, led by future President Theodore Roosevelt and his close ally George Bird Grinnell, were motivated by the wanton waste that was taking place at the hand of market forces, including logging and hunting. This practice resulted in placing a large number of North American game species on the edge of extinction. Roosevelt recognized that the laissez-faire approach of the U.S. Government was too wasteful and inefficient. In any case, they noted, most of the natural resources in the western states were already owned by the federal government.  The best course of action, they argued, was a long-term plan devised by national experts to maximize the long-term economic benefits of natural resources. To accomplish the mission, Roosevelt and Grinnell formed the Boone and Crockett Club, whose members were some of the best minds and influential men of the day. Its contingency of conservationists, scientists, politicians, and intellectuals became Roosevelt's closest advisers during his march to preserve wildlife and habitat across North America. 
 Preservationists: Preservationists, led by John Muir (1838–1914), argued that the conservation policies were not strong enough to protect the interest of the natural world because they continued to focus on the natural world as a source of economic production.

The debate between conservation and preservation reached its peak in the public debates over the construction of California's Hetch Hetchy dam in Yosemite National Park which supplies the water supply of San Francisco. Muir, leading the Sierra Club, declared that the valley must be preserved for the sake of its beauty: "No holier temple has ever been consecrated by the heart of man."

President Roosevelt put conservationist issues high on the national agenda. He worked with all the major figures of the movement, especially his chief advisor on the matter, Gifford Pinchot and was deeply committed to conserving natural resources. He encouraged the Newlands Reclamation Act of 1902 to promote federal construction of dams to irrigate small farms and placed 230 million acres (360,000 mi2 or 930,000 km2) under federal protection. Roosevelt set aside more federal land for national parks and nature preserves than all of his predecessors combined.

Roosevelt established the United States Forest Service, signed into law the creation of five national parks, and signed the year 1906 Antiquities Act, under which he proclaimed 18 new national monuments. He also established the first 51 bird reserves, four game preserves, and 150 national forests, including Shoshone National Forest, the nation's first.

Gifford Pinchot had been appointed by McKinley as chief of Division of Forestry in the Department of Agriculture. In 1905, his department gained control of the national forest reserves.  Pinchot promoted private use (for a fee) under federal supervision. In 1907, Roosevelt designated 16 million acres (65,000 km2) of new national forests just minutes before a deadline.

In May 1908, Roosevelt sponsored the Conference of Governors held in the White House, with a focus on natural resources and their most efficient use. Roosevelt delivered the opening address: "Conservation as a National Duty".

In 1903 Roosevelt toured the Yosemite Valley with John Muir, who had a very different view of conservation, and tried to minimize commercial use of water resources and forests.  Working through the Sierra Club he founded, Muir succeeded in 1905 in having Congress transfer the Mariposa Grove and Yosemite Valley to the federal government. While Muir wanted nature preserved for its own sake, Roosevelt subscribed to Pinchot's formulation, "to make the forest produce the largest amount of whatever crop or service will be most useful, and keep on producing it for generation after generation of men and trees."

Theodore Roosevelt's view on conservationism remained dominant for decades; Franklin D. Roosevelt authorised the building of many large-scale dams and water projects, as well as the expansion of the National Forest System to buy out sub-marginal farms.  In 1937, the Pittman–Robertson Federal Aid in Wildlife Restoration Act was signed into law, providing funding for state agencies to carry out their conservation efforts.

While Theodore Roosevelt was one of the leading activists for the conservation movement in the United States, he also believed that the threats to the natural world were equally threats to white Americans. They held the belief that the cities, industries and factories that were overtaking the wilderness and threatening the native plants and animals were also consuming and threatening the racial vigor that they believed white Americans held which made them superior. Roosevelt was a big believer that white male virility depended on wildlife for its vigor, and that depleting wildlife would result in a much weaker nation. This lead Roosevelt to support the passing of many immigration restrictions, eugenics legislations and wildlife preservation laws. He drew much inspiration for his beliefs from Madison Grant, a well known American eugenicist and conservationist. Grant worked alongside Roosevelt in the American conservation movement and was even secretary and president of the Boone and Crockett Club. In 1916, Grant published the book "The Passing of the Great Race", which explained the hierarchy of races, with white, "Nordic" men at the top, and all other races below. The German translation of this book was used by Nazi Germany as the source for many of their beliefs.

The National Audubon Society was founded in 1905 with the priority of protecting/conserving various waterbird species. However, the first state-level Audubon group was created in 1896 by Harriet Hemenway and Minna B. Hall to convince women to refrain from buying hats made with bird feathers- a common practice at the time. The organization is named after John Audubon, a naturalist and legendary bird painter. The lesser known truth is that he was a slaveholder who also included many racist tales in his many books. Despite his views of racial inequality, Audubon did find black and indigenous people to be scientifically useful, often using their local knowledge in his books and relying on them to collect specimens for him.

Since 1970
Environmental reemerged on the national agenda in 1970, with Republican Richard Nixon playing a major role, especially with his creation of the Environmental Protection Agency. The debates over the public lands and environmental politics played a supporting role in the decline of liberalism and the rise of modern environmentalism. Although Americans consistently rank environmental issues as "important", polling data indicates that in the voting booth voters rank the environmental issues low relative to other political concerns.

The growth of the Republican party's political power in the inland West (apart from the Pacific coast) was facilitated by the rise of popular opposition to public lands reform.  Successful Democrats in the inland West and Alaska typically take more conservative positions on environmental issues than Democrats from the Coastal states.  Conservatives drew on new organizational networks of think tanks, industry groups, and citizen-oriented organizations, and they began to deploy new strategies that affirmed the rights of individuals to their property, protection of extraction rights, to hunt and recreate, and to pursue happiness unencumbered by the federal government at the expense of resource conservation.

In 2019, convivial conservation was an idea proposed by Bram Büscher and Robert Fletcher. Convivial conservation draws on social movements and concepts like environmental justice and structural change to create a post-capitalist approach to conservation.

Conservation in Costa Rica

World Wide Fund for Nature 

The World Wide Fund for Nature (WWF) is an international non-governmental organization founded in 1961, working in the field of the wilderness preservation, and the reduction of human impact on the environment. It was formerly named the "World Wildlife Fund", which remains its official name in Canada and the United States.

WWF is the world's largest conservation organization with over five million supporters worldwide, working in more than 100 countries, supporting around 1,300 conservation and environmental projects.  They have invested over $1 billion in more than 12,000 conservation initiatives since 1995. WWF is a foundation with 55% of funding from individuals and bequests, 19% from government sources (such as the World Bank, DFID, USAID) and 8% from corporations in 2014.

WWF aims to "stop the degradation of the planet's natural environment and to build a future in which humans live in harmony with nature." The Living Planet Report is published every two years by WWF since 1998; it is based on a Living Planet Index and ecological footprint calculation. In addition, WWF has launched several notable worldwide campaigns including Earth Hour and Debt-for-Nature Swap, and its current work is organized around these six areas: food, climate, freshwater, wildlife, forests, and oceans.

"Conservation Far" approach 
A conservation-exploitation dichotomy has plagued a place many may not expect: Conservation institutions. Institutions such as the WWF have historically been the cause of the displacement and divide between native populations and the lands they inhabit. The overbearing reason behind this rather contradictory truth is because of the organization's historically colonial, paternalistic, and neoliberal approaches to conservation. Claus, in his article "Drawing the Sea Near: Satoumi and Coral Reef Conservation in Okinawa", expands on these approaches and their effectiveness, not as much in conservation, but in creating the value of and commercializing endangered flora and fauna. One way in which this has taken place is through a separation between people, even locals, and the nature spaces they aimed to protect. This is what Claus calls the "Conservation-Far" method, in which access to lands is completely relinquished upon the locals and tourists, by an external, foreign entity. This entity is largely unaware of the customs and values held by those within the territory surrounding nature and their role within it.

Claus relays the history of an Island in Japan, Shiraho, in which the people's traditional ways of tending to nature were lost due to modernization and the rise of a fast-paced lifestyle. It is the view of a "Conservation-Near" approach that would suggest a regeneration of these customs within the local area. This engages those near in proximity to the lands in the conservation efforts and holds them accountable for their direct effects on its preservation. Unlike the hands-on, full sensory experience permitted by conservation-near methodologies, conservation-far drills visuals and sight as being the main interaction medium between people and the environment. An emphasis on observation only stems from a deeper association with intellect and observation. The alternative to this is more of a bodily or "primitive" consciousness, which is associated with lower-intelligence and people of color. A new, integrated approach to conservation is being investigated in recent years by institutions such as WWF.

Evidence-based conservation

Areas of concern 

Deforestation and overpopulation are issues affecting all regions of the world.  The consequent destruction of wildlife habitat has prompted the creation of conservation groups in other countries, some founded by local hunters who have witnessed declining wildlife populations first hand.  Also, it was highly important for the conservation movement to solve problems of living conditions in the cities and the overpopulation of such places.

Boreal forest and the Arctic 
The idea of incentive conservation is a modern one but its practice has clearly defended some of the sub Arctic wildernesses and the wildlife in those regions for thousands of years, especially by indigenous peoples such as the Evenk, Yakut, Sami, Inuit and Cree. The fur trade and hunting by these peoples have preserved these regions for thousands of years. Ironically, the pressure now upon them comes from non-renewable resources such as oil, sometimes to make synthetic clothing which is advocated as a humane substitute for fur. (See Raccoon dog for case study of the conservation of an animal through fur trade.) Similarly, in the case of the beaver, hunting and fur trade were thought to bring about the animal's demise, when in fact they were an integral part of its conservation. For many years children's books stated and still do, that the decline in the beaver population was due to the fur trade. In reality however, the decline in beaver numbers was because of habitat destruction and deforestation, as well as its continued persecution as a pest (it causes flooding). In Cree lands, however, where the population valued the animal for meat and fur, it continued to thrive. The Inuit defend their relationship with the seal in response to outside critics.

Latin America (Bolivia) 
The Izoceño-Guaraní of Santa Cruz Department, Bolivia, is a tribe of hunters who were influential in establishing the Capitania del Alto y Bajo Isoso (CABI). CABI promotes economic growth and survival of the Izoceno people while discouraging the rapid destruction of habitat within Bolivia's Gran Chaco. They are responsible for the creation of the 34,000 square kilometre Kaa-Iya del Gran Chaco National Park and Integrated Management Area (KINP).  The KINP protects the most biodiverse portion of the Gran Chaco, an ecoregion shared with Argentina, Paraguay and Brazil. In 1996, the Wildlife Conservation Society joined forces with CABI to institute wildlife and hunting monitoring programs in 23 Izoceño communities. The partnership combines traditional beliefs and local knowledge with the political and administrative tools needed to effectively manage habitats. The programs rely solely on voluntary participation by local hunters who perform self-monitoring techniques and keep records of their hunts.  The information obtained by the hunters participating in the program has provided CABI with important data required to make educated decisions about the use of the land. Hunters have been willing participants in this program because of pride in their traditional activities, encouragement by their communities and expectations of benefits to the area.

Africa (Botswana) 
In order to discourage illegal South African hunting parties and ensure future local use and sustainability, indigenous hunters in Botswana began lobbying for and implementing conservation practices in the 1960s. The Fauna Preservation Society of Ngamiland (FPS) was formed in 1962 by the husband and wife team: Robert Kay and June Kay, environmentalists working in conjunction with the Batawana tribes to preserve wildlife habitat.

The FPS promotes habitat conservation and provides local education for preservation of wildlife. Conservation initiatives were met with strong opposition from the Botswana government because of the monies tied to big-game hunting. In 1963, BaTawanga Chiefs and tribal hunter/adventurers in conjunction with the FPS founded Moremi National Park and Wildlife Refuge, the first area to be set aside by tribal people rather than governmental forces. Moremi National Park is home to a variety of wildlife, including lions, giraffes, elephants, buffalo, zebra, cheetahs and antelope, and covers an area of 3,000 square kilometers.  Most of the groups involved with establishing this protected land were involved with hunting and were motivated by their personal observations of declining wildlife and habitat.

See also

Notes

Further reading

World
 Barton, Gregory A.  Empire, Forestry and the Origins of Environmentalism, (2002), covers British Empire
 Clover, Charles.  The End of the Line: How overfishing is changing the world and what we eat. (2004) Ebury Press, London. 
 Haq, Gary, and Alistair Paul. Environmentalism since 1945 (Routledge, 2013).
 Jones, Eric L. "The History of Natural Resource Exploitation in the Western World," Research in Economic History, 1991 Supplement 6, pp 235–252
 McNeill, John R. Something New Under the Sun: An Environmental History of the Twentieth Century (2000).

Regional studies

Africa
 Adams, Jonathan S.; McShane, Thomas O. Myth of Wild Africa: Conservation without Illusion (1992) 266p; covers 1900 to 1980s
 Anderson, David; Grove, Richard. Conservation in Africa: People, Policies & Practice (1988), 355pp
 Bolaane, Maitseo.  "Chiefs, Hunters & Adventurers:  The Foundation of the Okavango/Moremi National Park, Botswana".  Journal of Historical Geography. 31.2 (Apr. 2005): 241–259.
  Carruthers, Jane. "Africa: Histories, Ecologies, and Societies," Environment and History, 10 (2004), pp. 379–406;
 Showers, Kate B. Imperial Gullies: Soil Erosion and Conservation in Lesotho (2005) 346pp

Asia-Pacific
 Bolton, Geoffrey. Spoils and Spoilers: Australians Make Their Environment, 1788-1980 (1981) 197pp
 Economy, Elizabeth. The River Runs Black: The Environmental Challenge to China's Future (2010)
 Elvin, Mark. The Retreat of the Elephants: An Environmental History of China  (2006)
 Grove, Richard H.; Damodaran, Vinita Jain; Sangwan, Satpal. Nature and the Orient: The Environmental History of South and Southeast Asia (1998) 1036pp
 Johnson, Erik W., Saito, Yoshitaka, and Nishikido, Makoto. "Organizational Demography of Japanese Environmentalism," Sociological Inquiry, Nov 2009, Vol. 79 Issue 4, pp 481–504
 Thapar, Valmik. Land of the Tiger: A Natural History of the Indian Subcontinent (1998) 288pp

Latin America
 Boyer, Christopher. Political Landscapes: Forests, Conservation, and Community in Mexico. Duke University Press (2015)
 Dean, Warren. With Broadax and Firebrand: The Destruction of the Brazilian Atlantic Forest (1997)
 Evans, S. The Green Republic: A Conservation History of Costa Rica. University of Texas Press. (1999)
 Funes Monzote, Reinaldo. From Rainforest to Cane Field in Cuba: An Environmental History since 1492 (2008)
 Melville, Elinor G. K. A Plague of Sheep: Environmental Consequences of the Conquest of Mexico (1994) 
 Miller, Shawn William. An Environmental History of Latin America (2007)
 Noss, Andrew and Imke Oetting.  "Hunter Self-Monitoring by the Izoceño -Guarani in the Bolivian Chaco".  Biodiversity & Conservation. 14.11 (2005): 2679–2693.
 Simonian, Lane. Defending the Land of the Jaguar: A History of Conservation in Mexico (1995) 326pp
 Wakild, Emily. An Unexpected Environment:  National Park Creation, Resource Custodianship, and the Mexican Revolution. University of Arizona Press (2011).

Europe and Russia
 Arnone Sipari, Lorenzo, Scritti scelti di Erminio Sipari sul Parco Nazionale d'Abruzzo (1922-1933) (2011), 360pp.
 Barca, Stefania, and Ana Delicado. "Anti-nuclear mobilisation and environmentalism in Europe: A view from Portugal (1976-1986)." Environment and History 22.4 (2016): 497–520. online
 Bonhomme, Brian. Forests, Peasants and Revolutionaries: Forest Conservation & Organization in Soviet Russia, 1917-1929 (2005) 252pp.
 Cioc, Mark. The Rhine: An Eco-Biography, 1815-2000 (2002).
 Dryzek, John S., et al. Green states and social movements: environmentalism in the United States, United Kingdom, Germany, and Norway (Oxford UP, 2003).
 Jehlicka, Petr. "Environmentalism in Europe: an east-west comparison." in Social change and political transformation (Routledge, 2018) pp. 112–131.
 Simmons, I.G. An Environmental History of Great Britain: From 10,000 Years Ago to the Present (2001).
 Uekotter, Frank. The greenest nation?: A new history of German environmentalism (MIT Press, 2014).
 Weiner, Douglas R. Models of Nature: Ecology, Conservation and Cultural Revolution in Soviet Russia (2000) 324pp; covers 1917 to 1939.

United States
 Bates, J. Leonard.  "Fulfilling American Democracy: The Conservation Movement, 1907 to 1921", The Mississippi Valley Historical Review, (1957), 44#1 pp. 29–57. in JSTOR
 Brinkley, Douglas G. The Wilderness Warrior: Theodore Roosevelt and the Crusade for America, (2009)  excerpt and text search
 Cawley, R. McGreggor. Federal Land, Western Anger: The Sagebrush Rebellion and Environmental Politics (1993), on conservatives
 Flippen, J. Brooks. Nixon and the Environment (2000).
 Hays, Samuel P. Beauty, Health, and Permanence: Environmental Politics in the United States, 1955–1985 (1987), the standard scholarly history
 Hays, Samuel P. A History of Environmental Politics since 1945 (2000), shorter standard history
 Hays, Samuel P.  Conservation and the Gospel of Efficiency (1959), on Progressive Era.
 King, Judson. The Conservation Fight, From Theodore Roosevelt to the Tennessee Valley Authority (2009)
 Nash, Roderick. Wilderness and the American Mind, (3rd ed. 1982), the standard intellectual history
 
 Rothmun,  Hal K. The Greening of a Nation? Environmentalism in the United States since 1945 (1998)
 Scheffer, Victor B. The Shaping of Environmentalism in America (1991).
 Sellers, Christopher. Crabgrass Crucible: Suburban Nature and the Rise of Environmentalism in Twentieth-Century America (2012)
 Strong, Douglas H.  Dreamers & Defenders: American Conservationists. (1988) online edition, good biographical studies of the major leaders
 Taylor, Dorceta E. The Rise of the American Conservation Movement: Power, Privilege, and Environmental Protection  (Duke U.P. 2016) x, 486 pp. 
 Turner, James Morton, "The Specter of Environmentalism": Wilderness, Environmental Politics, and the Evolution of the New Right. The Journal of American History 96.1 (2009): 123-47 online at History Cooperative
 Vogel, David. California Greenin': How the Golden State Became an Environmental Leader (2018) 280 pp  online review

Historiography
 Cioc, Mark, Björn-Ola Linnér, and Matt Osborn, "Environmental History Writing in Northern Europe," Environmental History, 5 (2000), pp. 396–406
 Bess, Michael, Mark Cioc, and James Sievert, "Environmental History Writing in Southern Europe," Environmental History, 5 (2000), pp. 545–56;
 Coates, Peter. "Emerging from the Wilderness (or, from Redwoods to Bananas): Recent Environmental History in the United States and the Rest of the Americas," Environment and History, 10 (2004), pp. 407–38
 Hay, Peter. Main Currents in Western Environmental Thought (2002), standard scholarly history excerpt and text search
 McNeill, John R. "Observations on the Nature and Culture of Environmental History," History and Theory, 42 (2003), pp. 5–43.
 Robin, Libby,  and Tom Griffiths, "Environmental History in Australasia," Environment and History, 10 (2004), pp. 439–74
 Worster, Donald, ed. The Ends of the Earth: Perspectives on Modern Environmental History (1988)

External links 
 A history of conservation in New Zealand
 For Future Generations, a Canadian documentary on conservation and national parks

Environmental conservation
Environmental ethics
Environmental movements

el:Κίνημα Διατήρησης
fr:Conservation de la nature
sv:Naturskydd